The Italian Army ( []) is the land-based component of the Italian Armed Forces. The army's history dates back to the Italian unification in the 1850s and 1860s. The army fought in colonial engagements in China, Libya, Northern Italy against the Austro-Hungarian Empire during World War I, Abyssinia before World War II and in World War II in Albania, Balkans, North Africa, the Soviet Union, and Italy itself. During the Cold War, the army prepared itself to defend against a Warsaw Pact invasion from the east. Since the end of the Cold War, the army has seen extensive peacekeeping service and combat in Afghanistan and Iraq. Its best-known combat vehicles are the Dardo infantry fighting vehicle, the Centauro tank destroyer and the Ariete tank and among its aircraft the Mangusta attack helicopter, recently deployed in UN missions. The headquarters of the Army General Staff are located in Rome opposite the Quirinal Palace, where the president of Italy resides. The army is an all-volunteer force of active-duty personnel.

History 
The Italian Army originated as the Royal Army (Regio Esercito), which dates from the proclamation of the Kingdom of Italy following the seizure of the Papal States and the unification of Italy (Risorgimento). In 1861, under the leadership of Giuseppe Garibaldi, Victor Emmanuel II of the House of Savoy was invited to take the throne and of the newly created kingdom.

Italian expeditions were dispatched to China during the Boxer Rebellion of 1900 and to Libya during the Italo-Turkish War of 1911–1912.

World War I 

The Italian Royal Army's first real taste of modern warfare was during World War I.  Most of the actions were fought in northern Italy, and the Royal Army suffered many casualties.  This included over 700,000 dead. In particular, the frequency of the offensives in which Italian soldiers participated between May 1915 and August 1917, one every three months, was higher than demanded by the armies on the Western Front. Italian discipline was also harsher, with punishments for infractions of duty of a severity not known in the German, French, and British armies.

During the Interwar Years the Royal Army participated in the Italian Invasion of Ethiopia, provided men and materials during the Spanish Civil War to fight in the Corps of Volunteer Troops (Corpo Truppe Volontarie), and launched the Italian invasion of Albania.

World War II 

On paper, the Royal Army was one of the largest ground forces in World War II. In reality, it could not field the numbers claimed, and it was one of the pioneers in using paratroopers. Due to their generally smaller size, many Italian divisions were reinforced by an Assault Group (Gruppo d'Assalto) of two battalions of Blackshirts (MVSN).

Reports of Italian military prowess in the Second World War were almost always dismissive. This perception was the result of disastrous Italian offensives against Egypt and the performance of the army in the Greco-Italian War. Both campaigns were ill-prepared and executed inadequately.  The Italian 10th Army initially advanced into Egypt but surrendered after being pushed back into central Libya and almost all destroyed by British forces a fifth its size during the three-month Operation Compass.

The incompetent military leadership was aggravated by the Italian military's equipment, which predominantly dated back to the First World War and was not up to the standard of either the Allied or the German armies. Italian 'medium' M11, M13, M14 and M15 tanks were at a marked disadvantage against the comparatively heavily armed American Sherman tanks, for example. More crucially, Italy lacked suitable quantities of equipment of all kinds, and the Italian high command did not take the necessary steps to plan for possible battlefield setbacks or proper logistical support to its field armies. There were too few anti-aircraft weapons, obsolete anti-tank guns, and too few trucks.

The Italian Expeditionary Corps in Russia fought under General Giovanni Messe, who acknowledged the limitations of his Corps in material and equipment and thus was relieved of his command on November 1, 1942. When the Soviet offensive Operation Saturn began on December 12, 1942 the Italian 8th Army was quickly crushed. Only about a third of its troops managed to escape the Soviet cauldron, including from the three Alpini Divisions Tridentina, Julia and Cuneense.

In North Africa, the Italian 132 Armored Division Ariete and the 185 Airborne Division Folgore fought to total annihilation at the Second Battle of El Alamein. Although the battle was lost, the determined resistance of the Italian soldiers at the Battle of Keren in East Africa is still commemorated today by the Italian military.

After the Axis defeat in Tunisia, the morale of the Italian troops dropped. Once the Allies landed in Sicily on July 10, 1943, most Italian Coastal divisions simply dissolved. The sagging morale led to the overthrow of Italian dictator Benito Mussolini by King Victor Emmanuel III of Italy 15 days later.

In September 1943, Italy made an armistice with the Allies and split into the Italian Social Republic – effectively a puppet state of Germany – in the north and that of the Badoglio government in the south.  The Italian Co-Belligerent Army (Esercito Cobelligerante Italiano) was the army of the Italian royalist forces fighting on the side of the Allies in southern Italy after the Allied armistice with Italy in September 1943. The Italian soldiers fighting in this army no longer fought for Benito Mussolini as their allegiance was to King Victor Emmanuel and to Marshal of Italy (Maresciallo d'Italia) Pietro Badoglio, the men who ousted Mussolini.

Cold War 
The kingdom was replaced by a Republic in June 1946, and the Royal Army changed its name to become the Italian Army ("Esercito Italiano"). Initially, the army fielded five infantry divisions, created from the five combat groups of the Italian Co-belligerent Army and equipped with British material. Additionally the army fielded three internal security divisions without heavy equipment to garrison the country's two major islands:
 Infantry Division "Cremona", in Turin (formerly part of British V Corps)
 Infantry Division "Folgore", Florence (formerly part of British XIII Corps)
 Infantry Division "Friuli", in Bolzano (formerly part of Polish II Corps)
 Infantry Division "Legnano", in Bergamo (formerly part of Polish II Corps)
 Infantry Division "Mantova", in Varazze (formerly part of British Eighth Army)
 Internal Security Division "Aosta", in Palermo on Sicily
 Internal Security Division "Sabauda", in Enna on Sicily
 Internal Security Division "Calabria", in Sassari on Sardinia

As the status of the city of Free Territory of Trieste was disputed by the Socialist Federal Republic of Yugoslavia the Italian army moved the "Folgore" to Treviso and the "Mantova" to Gorizia in 1947. At the same time, the army began training an additional seven divisions and five Alpini brigades.
 Infantry Division "Aosta", in Messina (activated 1 February 1948)
 Infantry Division "Granatieri di Sardegna", in Civitavecchia (activated 1 April 1948)
 Infantry Division "Avellino", in Salerno (at reduced strength) (activated 1 September 1949)
 Alpine Brigade "Julia", in Cividale del Friuli (activated 15 October 1949)
 Motorized Infantry Division "Trieste", in Bologna (activated 1 June 1950)
 Alpine Brigade "Tridentina", in Bressanone (activated 1 May 1951)
 Infantry Division "Pinerolo", in Bari (at reduced strength) (activated 15 April 1952)
 Alpine Brigade "Taurinense", in Turin (activated 15 April 1952)
 Armored Division "Ariete", in Pordenone (activated 1 October 1952)
 Armored Division "Centauro", in Verona (activated 1 November 1952)
 Alpine Brigade "Orobica", in Merano (activated 1 January 1953)
 Armored Division "Pozzuolo del Friuli", in Rome (activated 1 January 1953)
 Alpine Brigade "Cadore", in Belluno (activated 1 July 1953)

Following the creation of NATO, the Italian Army was integrated into NATO's Allied Forces Southern Europe and prepared for a feared invasion from the east, possibly via Yugoslavia. Allied Land Forces Southern Europe (LANDSOUTH), was activated on 10 July 1951 to defend northeastern Italy. The command was headquartered at Verona, and placed under Lieutenant General Maurizio Lazzaro De Castiglioni.  Some three infantry divisions and three brigades were the only forces initially available to this command to defend northeastern Italy. The divisions in question were the Infantry Division "Mantova" in Gorizia, the Motorized Infantry Division "Folgore" in Treviso, the Motorized Infantry Division "Trieste" in Bologna. Two of the three brigades were Alpini mountain infantry brigades – the Alpine Brigade "Julia" in Cividale del Friuli and Alpine Brigade "Tridentina" in Brixen, while the third brigade was the Armored Brigade "Ariete" in Pordenone. Exercise "Italic Weld", a combined air-naval-ground exercise in northern Italy involving the United States, Italy, Turkey, and Greece, appears to have been one of the first exercises in which the new Italian Army orientation was tested.

On 1 May 1952 the army activated one army command and two corps commands, the Third Army in Padua, and the IV Army Corps in Bolzano and V Army Corps in Vittorio Veneto, to be able to circumvent NATO's chain of command in case a war should break out between Italy and Yugoslavia for the Free Territory of Trieste. Later in 1952 the army also raised the VI Army Corps in Bologna, followed by the III Army Corps in Milan in 1957, both of which were also assigned to the Third Army.

During the early 1960s the army reduced the "Trieste", "Friuli", "Pozzuolo del Friuli", "Pinerolo", "Avellino", and "Aosta" divisions to brigades and raised the I Paratroopers Brigade in Pisa. On 1 October 1965, the Infantry Brigade "Avellino" was disbanded and, on 10 June 1967, the 1st Paratroopers Brigade was allowed to add "Folgore" to its name. It was now named Paratroopers Brigade "Folgore". With the easing of tensions between Italy and Yugoslavia, the Third Army, along with VI Army Corps, was disbanded on 1 April 1972, and its functions were taken over by NATO's Allied Forces Southern Europe in Verona. Before the disbanding of Third Army the army's structure was as follows:

 Third Army, in Padua
 Anti-aircraft Artillery Command, in Padua
 III Army Corps, in Milan
 Armored Division "Centauro", in Novara
 Motorized Infantry Division "Legnano", in Bergamo
 Infantry Division "Cremona", in Cuneo
 Alpine Brigade "Taurinense", in Turin (transferred to IV Army Corps in 1972)
 IV Army Corps, in Bolzano (renamed IV Alpine Army Corps on 1 January 1973)
 Alpine Brigade "Orobica", in Merano
 Alpine Brigade "Tridentina", in Bressanone
 Carnia-Cadore Troops Command, in Belluno
 Alpine Brigade "Cadore", in Belluno
 Alpine Brigade "Julia", in Cividale del Friuli
 V Army Corps, in Vittorio Veneto
 Armored Division "Ariete", in Pordenone
 Motorized Infantry Division "Folgore", in Treviso
 Infantry Division "Mantova", in Udine
 Cavalry Brigade "Pozzuolo del Friuli", in Gorizia (a division-sized, armored formation)
 III Missile Brigade, in Portogruaro (armed with nuclear Honest John missiles)
 Trieste Troops Command, in Trieste
 Lagunari Regiment "Serenissima", in Venice (a brigade-sized formation)
 VI Army Corps, in Bologna
 Infantry Brigade "Friuli", in Firenze
 Infantry Brigade "Trieste", in Bologna
 Paratroopers Brigade "Folgore", in Pisa
 Army General Staff, in Rome
 I Military Territorial Command, in Turin
 V Military Territorial Command, in Padua
 VII Military Territorial Command, in Florence
 VIII Military Territorial Command, Rome
 Motorized Infantry Division "Granatieri di Sardegna", in Rome
 Sardinia Military Command, in Cagliari
 X Military Territorial Command, in Naples
 Infantry Brigade "Pinerolo", in Bari
 XI Military Territorial Command, in Palermo
 Infantry Brigade "Aosta", in Messina

1975 reform 

The most significant reorganization of the Italian Army took place in 1975, when the regimental level was abolished and battalions came under direct command of newly formed multi-arms brigades. At the same time, the reduction of the military service from 15 to 12 months for the army and air force and from 24 to 18 months for the navy forced the army to reduce its forces by nearly 45,000 troops. Therefore, while in the existing brigades "Orobica", "Tridentina", "Cadore", "Julia", "Taurinense", "Friuli", "Trieste", "Folgore", "Pinerolo", "Aosta" and "III Missile Brigade" only the regimental level was abolished, the divisions and "Pozzuolo del Friuli" brigade were subjected to major changes:

While the "Cremona" division was reduced to a brigade, the "Granatieri di Sardegna" and "Legnano" divisions and the "Pozzuolo del Friuli" brigade were split to create two new brigades each. Afterwards, the three divisions ceased to exist.

The remaining four divisions were also subjected to major changes and reductions, however, unlike the above three divisions, they remained in service after the reform. The units of the "Folgore" and "Mantova" divisions were mostly disbanded, and the remnants used to create one brigade each; then the two divisions were augmented by two brigades each to bring them back up to strength. The "Centauro" division was split into two brigades and then brought back to full strength by adding the Mechanized Brigade "Legnano". Only the "Ariete" division saw no reduction in its ranks, and its three regiments were used to create three brigades.

After the reform the structure of the army was:

 3rd Army Corps (Milan):
  Armored Division "Centauro" (Novara)
  3rd Mechanized Brigade "Goito" (Milan)
  Mechanized Brigade "Legnano" (Bergamo)
  31st Armored Brigade "Curtatone" (Bellinzago Novarese)
  Motorized Brigade "Cremona" (Turin)
 4th Alpine Army Corps (Bolzano):
  Alpine Brigade "Cadore" (Belluno)
  Alpine Brigade "Julia" (Udine)
  Alpine Brigade "Orobica" (Merano)
  Alpine Brigade "Taurinense" (Turin)
  Alpine Brigade "Tridentina" (Brixen)
 5th Army Corps (Vittorio Veneto):
  Armored Division "Ariete" (Pordenone)
  8th Mechanized Brigade "Garibaldi" (Pordenone)
  32nd Armored Brigade "Mameli" (Tauriano)
  132nd Armored Brigade "Manin" (Aviano)
  Mechanized Division "Folgore" (Treviso)
  Mechanized Brigade "Trieste" (Bologna)
  Mechanized Brigade "Gorizia" (Gorizia)
  Armored Brigade "Vittorio Veneto" (Villa Opicina)
 Amphibious Troops Command (Venice, a regiment-sized formation, tasked with the defence of the Venetian Lagoon)
  Mechanized Division "Mantova" (Udine)
  Mechanized Brigade "Brescia" (Brescia)
  Mechanized Brigade "Isonzo" (Cividale del Friuli)
  Armored Brigade "Pozzuolo del Friuli" (Palmanova)
  3rd Missile Brigade "Aquileia" (Portogruaro)
  Trieste Troops Command, (Trieste, a brigade-sized formation consisting mostly of reserve units)

The brigades under operational control of the Military Regions were:
 VII Territorial Military Command (Florence)
  Paratroopers Brigade "Folgore" (Livorno)
  Motorized Brigade "Friuli" (Florence)
 VIII Territorial Military Command (Rome)
  Motorized Brigade "Acqui" (L'Aquila)
  Mechanized Brigade "Granatieri di Sardegna" (Rome)
 X Territorial Military Command (Naples)
  Motorized Brigade "Pinerolo" (Bari)
 XI Territorial Military Command (Palermo)
  Motorized Brigade "Aosta" (Messina)

1986 reform 
In 1986 the remaining four divisional headquarters were dissolved and all brigades in Northern Italy came under direct command of the Army's three Army Corps, while the brigades in Central and Southern Italy came under operational control of the local administrative Military Regions. With the disappearance of the divisions the army renamed some of the divisional brigades and granted all of them a new coat of arms to reflect their new independence. By 1989 the army was structured as depicted in the graphic below:

Post Cold War 

At the end of the Cold War in 1989 the Italian Army consisted of 26 Combat Brigades: four Armored Brigades, ten Mechanized Infantry Brigades, five Motorized Infantry Brigades, five Alpine Brigades, one Rocket Artillery Brigade and one paratroopers Brigade.

The units were placed as follows under the three Army Corps's:

 3rd Army Corps (Milan):
  Armored Brigade "Centauro" (Novara)
  Mechanized Brigade "Goito" (Milan)
  Mechanized Brigade "Legnano" (Bergamo)
  Mechanized Brigade "Brescia" (Brescia)
  Mechanized Brigade "Trieste" (Bologna)
  Motorized Brigade "Cremona" (Turin)
 4th Alpine Army Corps (Bolzano):
  Alpine Brigade "Cadore" (Belluno)
  Alpine Brigade "Julia" (Udine)
  Alpine Brigade "Orobica" (Merano)
  Alpine Brigade "Taurinense" (Turin)
  Alpine Brigade "Tridentina" (Brixen)
 5th Army Corps (Vittorio Veneto):
  Armored Brigade "Ariete" (Aviano)
  Armored Brigade "Mameli" (Tauriano)
  Armored Brigade "Pozzuolo del Friuli" (Palmanova)
  Mechanized Brigade "Garibaldi" (Pordenone)
  Mechanized Brigade "Vittorio Veneto" (Villa Opicina)
  Mechanized Brigade "Gorizia" (Gorizia)
  Mechanized Brigade "Mantova" (Udine)
  3rd Missile Brigade "Aquileia" (Portogruaro)

The brigades under operational control of the Military Regions were:
 VII Territorial Military Command (Florence)
  Paratroopers Brigade "Folgore" (Livorno)
  Motorized Brigade "Friuli" (Florence)
 VIII Territorial Military Command (Rome)
  Motorized Brigade "Acqui" (L'Aquila)
  Mechanized Brigade "Granatieri di Sardegna" (Rome)
 X Territorial Military Command (Naples)
  Mechanized Brigade "Pinerolo" (Bari)
 XI Territorial Military Command (Palermo)
  Motorized Brigade "Aosta" (Messina)
 Autonomous Military Command Sardinia (Cagliari)
  Motorized Brigade "Sassari" (Sassari)

The Armored Brigades consisted of one Command & Signals Battalion, two or three Tank Battalions with Leopard 1A2 tanks, one Mechanized Infantry Battalion with M113 APCs, one Self-propelled Field Artillery Group with M109 howitzers, one Logistic Battalion, an Anti-Tank Company and an Engineer Company.

The Mechanized Brigades consisted of one Command & Signals Battalion, one Tank Battalion (Leopard 1), three Mechanized Infantry Battalions (M113), one Self-propelled Field Artillery Battalion with M109 howitzers, one Logistic Battalion, an Anti-Tank Company and an Engineer Company; however, the Pinerolo Mechanized Brigades fielded a Field Artillery Group with FH-70 howitzers. Additionally, the "Gorizia" and "Mantova" mechanized brigades fielded two Position Infantry battalions each, which were tasked with manning fortifications and bunkers along the Yugoslav-Italian border.

The Motorized Brigades consisted of one Command & Signals Battalion, one Armored Battalion (a mixed unit of tanks and mechanized infantry), three Motorized Infantry Battalions, one Field Artillery Group (FH-70), one Logistic Battalion, an Anti-Tank Company and an Engineer Company; however, the Sassari Brigade did not contain a field artillery battalion.

The Paratroopers Brigade "Folgore" did field one Command & Signals Battalion, one Paratroopers Assault Battalion (a Special Forces Unit), three Paratroopers Battalions, one Airborne Field Artillery Group with Mod 56 howitzers, one Logistic Battalion, one Army Aviation Helicopter Battalion and an Engineer Company.

Three of the five Alpine Brigades consisted of one Command & Signals Battalion, two Alpini Battalions, one Alpini Training Battalion, two Mountain Artillery Groups (Mod 56), one Logistic Battalion, an Anti-Tank Company and an Engineer Company; In contrast, the "Tridentina" brigade fielded an Alpini d'Arresto Battalion instead of the Alpini Training Battalion. The exception was the Julia Alpine Brigade which consisted of one Command & Signals Battalion, four Alpini Battalions, one Alpini d'Arresto Battalion, one Alpini Training Battalion, three Mountain Artillery Battalions, one Logistic Battalion, an Anti-Tank Company and an Engineer Company, making the Julia the largest brigade of the Italian Army.
The "d'Arresto" Alpini and Infantry units were designated to hold specific fortified locations directly at the border to slow down an attacking enemy. They were not a maneuver element but attached for training and logistic purposes to brigades stationed close to the border.

The Missile Brigade "Aquileia" fielded a mix of heavy artillery and missile units, both capable of firing tactical nuclear weapons. The main missile weapon of the brigade was the MGM-52 Lance missile.

Unit Summary 
In total the Italian Army fielded at the end of the Cold War:

Additionally the Army fielded 24 Anti-tank companies, one in each combat brigade except the "Sassari" brigade.

1991 reform 
In 1991, the Army began the post-Cold War draw-down of its forces with the disbandment of seven brigades and a large number of smaller units. The brigades disbanded in 1991 were the "Aquileia", "Brescia", "Goito", "Mameli", "Orobica", "Trieste", and "Vittorio Veneto". The units subordinated to these brigades were mostly disbanded, while the "Garibaldi" brigade command was transferred with one of its battalions to Campania.

1997 reform 
With the relaxing military situation, the Italian Army kept drawing down forces and disbanding smaller military units, which necessitated a major reorganization by 1997 to merge the remaining battalions into coherent units and disband now superfluous brigade commands. Thus a further six brigades were disbanded during the latter half of 1996 and 1997: "Acqui", "Cadore", "Cremona", "Gorizia", "Legnano", and "Mantova". In addition, the remaining units were moved to new bases and changed in composition, designation, and tasks. The three Army Corps were renamed, and their functions expanded: the 3rd Army Corps became the "Projection Forces Command" (COMFOP), commanding the rapid reaction forces of the Army, the 4th Alpine Army Corps became the "Alpine Troops Command" (COMALP) focusing on peace-keeping operations and the 5th Army Corps became the "1st Defense Forces Command" (COMFOD1) tasked with defending Northern Italy. On January 1, 1998, the "2nd Defense Forces Command" (COMFOD2) was activated in Naples and tasked with defending South and Central Italy. During the Cold War, the Italian Army units were to be commanded in wartime by NATO's LANDSOUTH Command in Verona; on October 1, 1997, out of elements of the aforementioned NATO Command, the new "Operational Terrestrial Forces Command" (COMFOTER) was activated. The COMFOTER took command of all the combat, combat support, combat service support and CIS units of the Italian Army. Along with the COMFOTER in Verona, a Support Command (COMSUP) was raised in Treviso, which gained operational control of all the remaining combat support, combat service support and CIS units of the Army. The COMSUP controlled three division-sized formations (Army Aviation Command, Air-Defense Artillery Command, C4-IEW Command) and three brigade-sized formations (Field Artillery Brigade, Engineer Brigade, Logistic Support Command).

Thus after the 1997 reform the structure of the Italian Army was as follows:
 COMFOTER (Verona):
 COMFOP (Milan):
  Paratroopers Brigade "Folgore" (Livorno)
  Mechanized Infantry Brigade "Friuli" (Bologna)
  Bersaglieri Brigade "Garibaldi" (Caserta)
 COMALP (Bolzano):
  Alpine Brigade "Julia" (Udine)
  Alpine Brigade "Taurinense" (Turin)
  Alpine Brigade "Tridentina" (Brixen)
 COMFOD 1 (Vittorio Veneto):
  Armored Brigade "Ariete" (Pordenone)
  Mechanized Infantry Brigade "Centauro" (Novara)
  Cavalry Brigade "Pozzuolo del Friuli" (Gorizia)
 COMFOD 2 (Naples):
  Mechanized Infantry Brigade "Aosta" (Messina)
  Mechanized Infantry Brigade "Granatieri di Sardegna" (Rome)
  Armored Brigade "Pinerolo" (Bari)
  Mechanized Infantry Brigade "Sassari" (Sassari)
 COMSUP (Treviso):
 Army Aviation Command (Viterbo)
 Anti-aircraft Artillery Command (Padua)
 C4-IEW Command (Anzio)
 Field Artillery Brigade (Portogruaro)
 Engineer Brigade (Udine)
 Logistic Support Command (Udine)

2002 reform 

Between 1997 and 2002 the Army continued to tweak the new structure and with the abolition of obligatory military service a further two brigades ("Centauro", "Tridentina") were disbanded in 2002. On December 1, 2000, the COMFOP became the NATO Rapid Deployable Corps Italy (NRDC-IT) and passed its subordinate units to the COMFOD 1 ("Friuli", "Folgore") and COMFOD 2 ("Garibaldi") commands. The "Friuli" Brigade changed its composition and became an airmobile brigade with Army Aviation, Cavalry and Infantry units. The COMSUP had already been reorganized and streamlined in 2000.

After 2002 the structure of the Italian Army was as follows:
 COMFOTER (Verona):
 NRDC-IT (Milan):
  NRDC-IT Signal Brigade (Milan)
 COMALP (Bolzano):
  Alpine Brigade "Julia" (Udine)
  Alpine Brigade "Taurinense" (Turin)
 COMFOD 1 (Vittorio Veneto):
  Armored Brigade "Ariete" (Pordenone)
  Parachute Infantry Brigade "Folgore" (Livorno)
  Airmobile Brigade "Friuli" (Bologna)
  Cavalry Brigade "Pozzuolo del Friuli" (Gorizia)
 COMFOD 2 (Naples):
  Mechanized Infantry Brigade "Aosta" (Messina)
  Bersaglieri Brigade "Garibaldi" (Caserta)
  Mechanized Infantry Brigade "Granatieri di Sardegna" (Rome)
  Armored Brigade "Pinerlo" (Bari)
  Mechanized Infantry Brigade "Sassari" (Sassari)
 C4-IEW Command (Anzio)
 COMSUP (Treviso):
 Anti-aircraft Artillery Brigade (Padua)
 Air Cavalry Command (Viterbo)
 Field Artillery Brigade (Portogruaro)
 Engineer Brigade (Udine)
 Logistic Projection Brigade (Udine)

2011 reform 
During 2011 some small changes regarding the support units of the Army were enacted. The COMSUP took command of the Army's schools and merged them, where possible, with the support brigades. Minor units were moved South and to the islands to reduce the Army's footprint in the wealthier North of Italy. At the same time, the designation of the "Pinerolo" brigade was changed back to Mechanized Infantry Brigade. Afterwards the COMSUP consisted, besides four Army schools of the following commands:
 Anti-aircraft Artillery Command (Sabaudia)
 Artillery Command (Bracciano)
 Engineer Command (Rome)
 Logistic Projection Command (Rome)

2013 reform 

In 2013 the Army began a major reform. The three corp-level commands COMFOD 1, COMFOD 2 and COMALP were to disband, while the "Mantova" Division Command moved from Vittorio Veneto to Florence, where it was renamed as Division "Friuli", taking the name and traditions of the Air Assault Brigade "Friuli". Together with the other two divisions Acqui and Tridentina the Friuli took command of operational brigades of the Italian Army.

The Logistic Projection Command was disbanded, and its units attached directly to the brigades. As part of the reform, the Army raised the Army Special Forces Command (COMFOSE) in Pisa, which took command of all Special Operations Forces of the Army. Furthermore, the Operational Terrestrial Forces Command (COMFOTER) in Verona was split on 1 October 2016 into the "Operational Land Forces Command and Army Operational Command" in Rome and the "Operational Land Forces Support Command" in Verona.

At the end of the reform the plan envisioned that the Army would consist of:
 2x heavy brigades (Ariete, Garibaldi) armed with, Centauro tank destroyers, Ariete tanks, Dardo infantry fighting vehicles and PzH2000 self propelled artillery
 2x medium brigades (Aosta, Pinerolo) armed with Centauro tank destroyers and Freccia infantry fighting vehicles and FH-70 towed artillery
 4x light brigades (Folgore, Julia, Taurinense, Sassari) armed with Centauro tank destroyers, Puma armoured personnel carriers and FH-70 towed artillery
 1x air-assault brigade (Pozzuolo del Friuli) with Pumas, A129 Mangusta attack and NH90 transport helicopters.

After the reform, each maneuver brigade, except the "Pozzuolo del Friuli" and "Sassari, was planned to field the following units: a command and signal unit with the brigade staff, one cavalry reconnaissance regiment, three combat maneuver regiments, one artillery regiment, one engineer regiment, and one logistic regiment.

The "Pozzuolo del Friuli" brigade was planned to merge with the "Friuli" brigade and field a cavalry reconnaissance regiment, an air-assault infantry regiment, an amphibious-assault infantry regiment, a reconnaissance helicopter regiment, an attack helicopter regiment, a field artillery regiment, an engineer regiment, a logistic regiment as well as the standard command and signal unit with the brigade staff.

The "Sassari" brigade would not field a cavalry reconnaissance regiment and an artillery regiment unless funds were to be found to raise these units on Sardinia. The "Granatieri di Sardegna" brigade was destined to disband, with its cavalry regiment joining the "Pinerolo" brigade. In contrast, the 1st Granatieri di Sardegna Regiment was planned to become a public duties unit under the Capital Military Command in Rome. In 2013 the reform started with the disbanding of the 131st Tank Regiment and the 57th Infantry Battalion "Abruzzi", while the 33rd Field Artillery Regiment "Acqui" was reformed as 185th Paratroopers Artillery Regiment "Folgore". In 2014 the 2nd Mountain Artillery Regiment was disbanded, followed by the 5th Anti-aircraft Artillery Regiment "Pescara" and the 47th Infantry Regiment "Ferrara" in 2015.

As part of the reform, all army schools, training regiments and training centres were to be combined into the newly raised Army Formation, Specialisation and Doctrine Command (Comando per la Formazione, Specializzazione e Dottrina dell’Esercito or COMFORDOT) in Rome. However, as of July 2019, the Alpine Training Center and the Parachuting Training Center remain with the Alpine Troops Command and the Paratroopers Brigade Folgore, respectively.

2019 changes 

As the security situation in Europe had changed in 2014 with the Russian annexation of Crimea the 2013 reform was paused. Neither were the "Pozzuolo del Friuli", and "Friuli" brigades merged, nor was the "Granatieri di Sardegna" brigade disbanded. On 1 July 2019, the army officially ended the 2013 reform: on that date in Florence, the Division "Friuli" was renamed Division "Vittorio Veneto". With this, the traditions of the name "Friuli" returned to the Airmobile Brigade "Friuli", whose merger with the "Pozzuolo del Friuli" brigade was disbanded. Likewise the disbanding of the "Granatieri di Sardegna" brigade was disbanded, and it was decided that the second battalion of the brigade's 1st "Granatieri di Sardegna" "Regiment" would become independent as 2nd Grenadier Battalion "Cengio" and grow to regiment by 2020 as first step to bring the brigade back to full strength.

On 10 January 2020 the 31st Tank Regiment was reformed as Regiment "Cavalleggeri di Lodi" (15th) thus completing the transformation of the Mechanized Brigade "Pinerolo".

Operations
The Italian Army has participated in operations to aid populations hit by natural disasters. It has, moreover, supplied a remarkable contribution to the forces of police for the control of the territory of the province of Bolzano/Bozen (1967), in Sardinia ("Forza Paris" 1992), in Sicily ("Vespri Siciliani"1992) and in Calabria (1994). Currently, it protects sensitive objectives and places throughout the national territory ("Operazione Domino") since the September 11 attacks in the United States. The army is also engaged in Missions abroad under the aegis of the UN, the NATO, and of Multinational forces, such as Beirut in Lebanon (1982), Namibia (1989), Albania (1991), Kurdistan (1991), Somalia (1992), Mozambique (1993), Bosnia (1995), East Timor and Kosovo (both in 1999), the Democratic Republic of the Congo (2001), Darfur (2003), Afghanistan (2002), Iraq (2003) and Lebanon again (2006) (in fact from 1980, Italy was the third major world contributor, after USA and UK, in peacekeeping missions).

The Carabinieri, once the senior corps of the Army, is now an autonomous armed force (alongside the Army, Navy and Air Force). The Carabinieri provide military police services to all the Italian armed forces.

Command structure

The Armed Forces of Italy are under the command of the Italian Supreme Defense Council, presided over by the President of the Italian Republic.

Ranks

Ranks are part of the uniform.

Organisation 

For the detailed structure of the Italian Army, see Structure of the Italian Army.

Unit organizations 

All brigades have been deployed and are continuously deployed in operations outside of Italy. Combat brigades field between 3–5,000 troops each. Brigade maneuver units are designated as regiments but field men and equipment similar to large battalions, consisting of large Command and Logistic Support Company and a combat battalion. Artillery regiments field and additional Surveillance, Target Acquisition and Tactical Liaison Battery.

Every complete Italian Army brigade fields the following units:

 Brigade Headquarter
 Command and Tactical Support Battalion
 Command Company
 Signal Company
 Cavalry Regiment
 Command and Logistic Support Squadron
 Armored Squadrons Group
 3× Reconnaissance Squadrons (each with 6× Centauro and 12× Puma 4×4 (Centauros to be replaced with 6× Freccia EVO Reconnaissance and the Pumas with VTLM Lince II))
 Heavy Armored Squadron (14× Centauro, (to be replaced with Centauro II))
 Artillery Regiment
 Command and Logistic Support Battery
 Surveillance, Target Acquisition and Tactical Liaison Battery (with artillery radars, drones, forward observers)
 Artillery Group
 3× Howitzer Batteries (each with 6× PzH2000 or FH70 howitzers)
 Fire and Technical Support Battery (Fire Direction Center) 
 Engineer Regiment
 Command and Logistic Support Company
 Engineer Battalion
 3× Sapper Companies (Combat engineers)
 Deployment Support Company (Construction, bridging, etc.)
 Logistic Regiment
 Command and Logistic Support Company
 Logistic Battalion
 Supply Company
 Maintenance Company
 Transport Company

Depending on the type of brigade (light, medium, heavy) each brigade fields three maneuver battalions. Currently, the Folgore, Taurinense, and Julia each field three light infantry regiments, the Pinerolo and Aosta each field three medium infantry regiments, and the Garibaldi and Ariete field two, respectively one heavy infantry regiment, and one, respectively two tank regiments. The Friuli, Sassari, Granatieri di Sardegna and Pozzuolo del Friuli brigades' regiments are structured like all other army regiments. However, these four brigades do not field the full complement of eight units.

Currently the army's maneuver regiments are organized as follows:
 Light Infantry Regiment (Alpini, Lagunari, Paratroopers; and 66th Infantry Regiment)
 Command and Logistic Support Company
 Infantry Battalion
 3× Rifle Companies (with Puma 6×6, Bv206 (Alpini), and VTLM Lince; each company with 3× 81mm mortars and 2× Spike MR launchers)
 Maneuver Support Company (4× 120mm mortars, 4× Spike MR launchers)
 Medium Infantry Regiment (5th, 9th, 62nd, and 82nd infantry regiments; 3rd, 6th, and 7th Bersaglieri regiments)
 Command and Logistic Support Company
 Infantry Battalion
 3× Rifle Companies (each with 14× Freccia Combat, 3× 81mm mortars, 2× Freccia Combat Anti-tank with Spike LR and 2× Spike MR launchers)
 Maneuver Support Company (2× Freccia Combat, 4× Freccia Mortar Carrier with 120mm mortar, 4× Freccia Combat Anti-tank with Spike LR and 4× Spike MR launchers, 12x VTLM Lince reconnaissance role)
 Heavy Infantry Regiment (1st, 8th, and 11th Bersaglieri regiments; 1st and 2nd Grenadier regiments)
 Command and Logistic Support Company
 Infantry Battalion
 3× Rifle Companies (each with 14× Dardo IFV, 3× 81mm mortars, 2× Dardo Spike LR)
 Maneuver Support Company (2× Dardo IFV, 4× M106 120mm mortar carriers, 4× Dardo Spike LR)
 Tank Regiment (4th, 32nd, and 132nd tank regiments)
 Command and Logistic Support Company
 Tank Battalion
 3× Tank Companies (each with 13× Ariete main battle tanks)

Two of the three infantry regiments of the Sassari brigade are still equipped as light regiments, while the brigade's 3rd Bersaglieri Regiment has begun the switch to medium infantry regiment on 6 January 2018. The 2nd Regiment "Granatieri di Sardegna" was reactivated on 1 September 2022 as a light infantry regiment and will switch to heavy regiment once new tracked infantry fighting vehicles will be acquired by the army.

Equipment

Uniforms

The Italian Army uses uniforms that can be divided into four different "families", and hold strict rules that apply to the type of textile, color and badge of the uniforms.. These include: the Regular Uniform (the only one that includes seasonal variations), the Service Uniform, the Service Combat Uniform, and the Ceremonial Uniform (only for officials).

The Regular Uniform 
The Regular Uniform comes in summer and winter versions differing exclusively in textiles used. A single-breasted jacket with four buttons and four pockets, and trousers with a classic cut and front pleats with five pockets. The undershirt also has two small pockets. The uniform is completed by a necktie, brown leather gloves, brown shoes, khaki socks, and a cap or headdress.

The Service Uniform 
The summer and winter Service Uniform have identical cuts and colors to the Regular uniform, while active military personnel always utilize a special headdress included with the uniform.

The Service Combat Uniform 
The Service Combat Uniform is most commonly used out of the four "families" and is distributed to all soldiers with the same mimetic pattern (paratroopers have a different model with strengthening on the shoulders). The uniform comprises a beret, a five-button closure jacket with two internal pockets, and trousers with four pockets. Accessories completing the uniform include gloves, special footwear and a t-shirt with short or long sleeves, depending on the season.

The Ceremonial Uniform 
The Ceremonial Uniform includes a double-breasted jacket with six buttons and two pockets on the hips. Trousers come with a classic cut, having the same jacket fabric. The winter version can be worn with the blue cape infantry, a black rigid cap, white gloves and black shoes. Other accessories such as the necktie, a light blue scarf and a sabre complete the uniform.

Operations

A post-World War II peace treaty signed by Italy prevented the country from deploying military forces in overseas operations as well as possessing fixed-wing vessel-based aircraft for twenty-five years following the end of the war.

This treaty expired in 1970, but it would not be until 1982 that Italy first deployed troops on foreign soil, with a peacekeeping contingent dispatched to Beirut following a United Nations request for troops. Since the 1980s, Italian troops have participated with other Western countries in peacekeeping operations across the world, especially in Africa, Balkan Peninsula, and the Middle East.

The Italian Army has not engaged in major combat operations since World War II. However, Italian Special Forces have taken part in anti-Taliban operations in Afghanistan as part of Task Force 'Nibbio'. Italy was not yet a member of the United Nations in 1950 at the time of the war with North Korea.

Italy did take part in the 1990–91 Gulf War but solely through the deployment of eight Italian Air Force Panavia Tornado IDS bomber jets to Saudi Arabia; Italian Army troops were subsequently deployed to assist Kurdish refugees in northern Iraq following the conflict.

As part of Operation Enduring Freedom in response to the September 11 attacks, Italy contributed to the international operation in Afghanistan. Italian forces have contributed to ISAF, the NATO force in Afghanistan, and a Provincial reconstruction team, and 53 Italian soldiers have died under ISAF. Italy has sent 4200 troops, based on one infantry company from the 2nd Alpini Regiment tasked to protect the ISAF HQ, one engineer company, one NBC platoon, one logistic unit, as well as liaison and staff elements integrated into the operation chain of command. Italian forces also command a multinational engineer task force and have deployed a platoon of Italian military police. Italy leads the Regional Command West in Afghanistan, and its HQ is located in Herat at Camp Arena base. Italian Air Force deployed about 30 aircraft, both helicopters and planes: four AMX Ghibli and two RQ-1A Predator that are used in close air support and intelligence missions, Alenia C-27J Spartan, Boeing CH-47C Chinook, NH90 and Lockheed C-130 Hercules, which are used in transport missions; Bell UH-1N Twin Huey and Agusta A129CBT Mangusta are used in missions of fire support to the troops.

The Italian Army did not take part in combat operations of the 2003 Second Gulf War, dispatching troops only after May 1, 2003 – when major combat operations were declared over by the U.S. President George W. Bush. Subsequently, Italian troops arrived in the late summer of 2003 and began patrolling Nasiriyah and the surrounding area. On 26 May 2006, Italian foreign minister Massimo d'Alema announced that the Italian forces would be reduced to 1,600 by June. As of June 2006, 32 Italian troops have been killed in Iraq – with the greatest single loss of life coming on November 12, 2003 – a suicide car bombing of the Italian Carabinieri Corps HQ left a dozen Carabinieri, five Army soldiers, two Italian and eight Iraqi civilians dead.

As of 2006, Italy ranks third in the world in the number of deployed military forces operating in peacekeeping and peace-enforcing scenarios Afghanistan, Kosovo, Bosnia and Herzegovina, and Lebanon, behind only to the United States and the United Kingdom.

A recent law promoted recruitment in the Italian Army, giving volunteers a chance to find post-service careers in the Carabinieri, Italian State Police, Italian Finance Police, State Forestry Department, Fire Department and other state bodies.

See also
 List of units of the Italian Army
 Regio Esercito (World War II)
 Uniforms of the Italian Armed Forces
 List of military weapons of Italy

References

External links

 Official Website of the Italian Army

1861 establishments in Italy
Military units and formations established in 1861